James Alexander Maynard (born 10 June 1987) is an English mathematician working in analytic number theory and in particular the theory of prime numbers. In 2017, he was appointed Research Professor at Oxford. Maynard is a fellow of St John's College, Oxford. He was awarded the Fields Medal in 2022.

Biography 
Maynard attended King Edward VI Grammar School, Chelmsford in Chelmsford, England. After completing his bachelor's and master's degrees at Queens' College, University of Cambridge in 2009, Maynard obtained his D.Phil. from University of Oxford at Balliol College in 2013 under the supervision of Roger Heath-Brown. He then became a Fellow by Examination at Magdalen College, Oxford.

For the 2013–2014 year, Maynard was a CRM-ISM postdoctoral researcher at the University of Montreal.

In November 2013, Maynard gave a different proof of Yitang Zhang's theorem that there are bounded gaps between primes, and resolved a longstanding conjecture by showing that for any  there are infinitely many intervals of bounded length containing  prime numbers. This work can be seen as progress on the Hardy–Littlewood -tuples conjecture as it establishes that "a positive proportion of admissible -tuples satisfy the prime -tuples conjecture for every ." Maynard's approach yielded the upper bound, with  denoting the 'th prime number,

which improved significantly upon the best existing bounds due to the Polymath8 project. (In other words, he showed that there are infinitely many prime gaps with size of at most 600.) Subsequently, Polymath8b was created, whose collaborative efforts have reduced the gap size to 246, according to an announcement on 14 April 2014 by the Polymath project wiki. Further, assuming the Elliott–Halberstam conjecture and, separately, its generalised form, the Polymath project wiki states that the gap size has been reduced to 12 and 6, respectively.

In August 2014, Maynard (independently of Ford, Green, Konyagin and Tao) resolved a longstanding conjecture of Erdős on large gaps between primes, and received the largest Erdős prize ($10,000) ever offered.

In 2014, he was awarded the SASTRA Ramanujan Prize. In 2015, he was awarded a Whitehead Prize and in 2016 an EMS Prize.

In 2016, he showed that, for any given decimal digit, there are infinitely many prime numbers that do not have that digit in their decimal expansion.

In 2019, together with Dimitris Koukoulopoulos, he proved the Duffin–Schaeffer conjecture.

Maynard was awarded the Fields Medal 2022 for "contributions to analytic number theory, which have led to major advances in the understanding of the structure of prime numbers and in Diophantine approximation".

Personal life
Maynard was born on 10 June 1987 in Chelmsford, England. His partner is Eleanor Grant, a medical doctor. They have a child.

References

External links
 Maynard interviewed by Brady Haran on the Twin Prime Conjecture
 Maynard interviewed by Brady Haran on the completion of the Duffin-Schaeffer Conjecture
 

1987 births
Living people
English mathematicians
Alumni of the University of Cambridge
Alumni of the University of Oxford
Whitehead Prize winners
People educated at King Edward VI Grammar School, Chelmsford
Fields Medalists